Pätzer Vordersee is a lake in Bestensee, Brandenburg, Germany. At an elevation of 34.4 m, its surface area is 1.7 km².

Lakes of Brandenburg
Dahme-Spreewald